Amelia Fletcher  (born 1 January 1966) is a British singer, songwriter, guitarist and economist.

Music career
Fletcher has been the frontwoman of an evolving series of pop groups from the 1980s to the present. Her bands included Talulah Gosh, Heavenly, Marine Research, Tender Trap, and, since 2014, The Catenary Wires.  In 2020, she began a new band, Swansea Sound, with The Pooh Sticks's Hue Williams.

She also sang backing vocals for The Wedding Present early in their career and on the Hefner album We Love the City. She toured with, and was guest vocalist for, The Pooh Sticks on their albums Orgasm, Million Seller and The Great White Wonder, and in 1988 released a single under her own name, "Can You Keep a Secret?" She has also appeared as a guest vocalist for The 6ths on the song "Looking For Love (In the Hall Of Mirrors)", on both Bugbear recordings, a single by The Hit Parade, and "Why Do You Have to Go Out With Him When You Could Go Out With Me?" single by The Brilliant Corners. Since 2002 she has been keyboardist for Sportique. Amelia Fletcher was also an early promoter of Scottish act Bis who Heavenly performed alongside and whose lead singer, Manda Rin, repeatedly cited Amelia as one of her inspirations/influences.

Economics career
Fletcher read economics at St Edmund Hall, Oxford. In 1993, she completed a D.Phil. in economics at Nuffield College, Oxford titled 'Theories of Self-Regulation'.  In 2001, she was appointed Chief Economist at the Office of Fair Trading and in 2008 took on the additional role of Senior Director of Mergers. She left in April 2013, to become Professor of Competition Policy at the University of East Anglia. She also sat on the board of the Financial Conduct Authority (2013-2020) and Payment Systems Regulator (2014-2020). She was appointed Non-Executive Director of the Competition and Markets Authority on 1 October 2016.

Fletcher was appointed Officer of the Order of the British Empire (OBE) in the 2014 New Years Honours list for services to competition and consumer economics and Commander of the Order of the British Empire (CBE) in the 2020 Birthday Honours for services to the economy.

Personal life
Fletcher has two children with her partner Rob Pursey, also a member of Heavenly, Talulah Gosh, Marine Research, Tender Trap and The Catenary Wires. She is the daughter of Jean and Winston Fletcher.

References

External links 
 http://www.pennyblackmusic.co.uk/MagSitePages/Article.aspx?id=3956 - Interview, part 1
 http://www.pennyblackmusic.co.uk/MagSitePages/Article.aspx?id=3982 - Interview, part 2
 http://www.pennyblackmusic.co.uk/MagSitePages/Article.aspx?id=3999 - Interview, part 3

1966 births
Living people
Academics of the University of East Anglia
Alumni of St Edmund Hall, Oxford
Alumni of Nuffield College, Oxford
Commanders of the Order of the British Empire
English women singer-songwriters
English economists
British women economists
English women guitarists
English guitarists